Taratala Metro Station is a station on Line 3 of the Kolkata Metro located in the Taratala area of ​​southern Kolkata, India. The station is named after the locality in which the station is located. The station is elevated above Diamond Harbour Road.

Location 
This station is located in Taratala area. The geographical location of the station is 22.4987215°N 88.3146276°E . The previous station of the station is Behala Bazar Metro Station at a distance of 1.03 km and the next station is Magherhat Metro Station at a distance of 1.25 km.

History 
Purple Line was approved in the railway budget for the financial year 2010-2011 and Rs 2,6519 crore was allocated for the construction work. In October 2011, NVRL won the tender for the construction of the Metro Corridor from Joka Metro Station to Esplanade Metro Station along with the Thakurpukur metro station.

Trial runs on the 6.5-km Joka-Taratla stretch of Kolkata Metro's Purple Line began in mid-September 2022, and it received mandatory Commissioner of Railway Safety (CRS) clearance in November.

Prime Minister Narendra Modi inaugurated the Joka-Taratala stretch, including Joka metro station of Kolkata Metro's Purple Line on 30 December 2022 in the presence of West Bengal Chief Minister Mamata Banerjee and Indian Railway Minister Ashwini Vaishnaw. Some students from schools like St Thomas Boys School were granted the rare opportunity to be the first ones to ride in this Joka-Taratala stretch after the inauguration.

Station

Structure

Layout
Metro arriving at Taratala Metro Station during the 1st run on the opening day
Taratala Metro Station, which belongs to Line 3 of Kolkata Metro , is structurally an elevated metro station. The station has total 3 levels. Station entrances and exits begin or end at the first level or ground level. Second level or L1 or intermediate level houses station fare control, station agents, metro card vending machines, crossovers etc. The third level or L2 or the final level houses the platforms and rail tracks. The station is 200 meters long and 25 meters wide. 
Infrastructure 
The station is being built with state-of-the-art technology. The station has 4 entrances and exits for entry and exit. The second level of the station has ticket collection center, ticket validator for ticket examination. The station will have escalators for the convenience of passengers. It is equipped with several modern amenities, such as escalators, lifts, CCTV cameras, and public address systems, to ensure the safety and convenience of passengers. Besides, the station will have drinking water and toilet facilities.

Electricity and signal systems 
Like the other stations and lines of the Kolkata Metro, this station will use 750 volts DC power supply by the third railway to operate the trains.

Train movement will be conducted at this station and on the railway by communication-based train control signal system. This signal system can operate a 5 second interval train. Currently this automatic signalling system is not activated and only one metro track is operational.

Finance 
Indian Railways has spent Rs 2,477.25 crore to construct six stations and metro rail system on the 6.5 km long Joka-Taratla route including Behala Bazar.

Connections

Bus 

Rail 

Air 
Behala Airport is  via Behala Flying Club Road and Taratala Road.

See also
List of Kolkata Metro stations

References 

Kolkata Metro stations